Squeaks and Squawks is a 1920 American silent comedy film featuring Oliver Hardy.

Cast
 Jimmy Aubrey - The Repairman
 Dixie Lamont - The Blacksmith's Daughter
 Oliver Hardy - The Landlord (as Babe Hardy)
 Dick Dickinson - The Blacksmith

See also
 List of American films of 1920
 Oliver Hardy filmography

External links

1920 films
American silent short films
American black-and-white films
1920 comedy films
Films directed by Noel M. Smith
1920 short films
Silent American comedy films
American comedy short films
1920s American films